Hoecake Village Archeological Site (23MI8) is a historic archeological site located near East Prairie, Mississippi County, Missouri.  This site was investigated by archaeologists from the University of Missouri during 1963 and 1967. Almost all of the mounds were leveled before the 1960s. The site includes two surviving burial mounds, which were excavated in 1988. It was added to the National Register of Historic Places in 1972.

References

Mounds in Missouri
Archaeological sites on the National Register of Historic Places in Missouri
Buildings and structures in Mississippi County, Missouri
National Register of Historic Places in Mississippi County, Missouri